Jon Barrenetxea (born 20 April 2000) is a Spanish cyclist, who currently rides for UCI ProTeam .

2022 Tour of Britain - Jon Barrenetxea was in team Caja Rural – Seguros RGA

Major results
2018
 1st  Road race, National Junior Road Championships
2022
 1st  Mountains classification Vuelta a Andalucía
 1st  Young rider classification International Tour of Hellas

References

External links

2000 births
Living people
Spanish male cyclists
People from Busturialdea
Cyclists from the Basque Country (autonomous community)
Sportspeople from Biscay
21st-century Spanish people